Bisetifer is a genus of  dwarf spiders that was first described by A. V. Tanasevitch in 1987.  it contains only two species: B. cephalotus and B. gruzin.

See also
 List of Linyphiidae species

References

Araneomorphae genera
Linyphiidae
Spiders of Asia